Typhoon Nina, known in the Philippines as Typhoon Bebeng, was a deadly tropical cyclone that triggered the Banqiao Dam collapse in China's Henan Province, China in August 1975. It formed on July 30, and gradually intensified as it moved generally to the west. On August 2, Nina reached peak intensity, and a day later the typhoon struck Taiwan. It weakened before moving ashore southeastern China, and later moved slowly through Central China. There, it dropped heavy rainfall, causing several dam failures, including the Banqiao Dam. It is the deadliest typhoon in the Pacific, killing 229,000 people. The floods killed 26,000 people, 100,000 people died from subsequent famine and diseases, and 230,000 people died from the consequences of the 1975 Banqiao Dam failure.

Meteorological history

A well defined trough line extending southeastward into the Philippine Sea spawned a disturbance on July 29. After its initial status as a disturbance, Tropical Depression 04W was designated and moved southwestward for 36 hours as the structure of the system began to organize. On July 31, the depression slowed and began to rapidly intensify, becoming a tropical storm and was named "Nina". It  began to turn to the northwest afterward. A subtropical ridge prevented Nina from turning further north and it began to track west-northwest just before reaching typhoon intensity.

Nina underwent explosive development on the late hours of August 1. Aircraft reconnaissance reported a 65 hPa drop of pressure, increasing from a mere 65 kn (75 mph, 120 km/h) to 130 kt (150 mph, 240 km/h) the day after. During that period, it attained its peak intensity of 135 kn (155 mph, 250 km/h). The typhoon began to weaken as it approached Taiwan, making landfall near the coastal city of Hualien as a Category 3 storm with 100 kn (115 mph, 185 km/h) winds.

The storm began to weaken as it went across the island's central mountain range, sparing the most populated areas from the eyewall. It entered the Formosa Straits as a weak typhoon, making another landfall near Jinjiang, Fujian. After moving northwest and crossing Jiangxi, it turned north on the night of August 5 near Changde, Hunan. A day later, the storm moved over Xinyang, Henan, and was later blocked by a cold front near Zhumadian, Henan for three days. The stationary thunderstorm system brought heavy rainfall, causing the infamous collapse of the Banqiao Dam. The storm moved southwest on August 8, and dissipated soon afterwards.

Impact

Taiwan
Upon making landfall in Taiwan, the storm brought winds of 185 km/h (115 mph) to places near the storm's eye. Reports from the island indicate that 3,000 homes were damaged or destroyed by the typhoon. In the city of Hualien alone, four people were killed, 561 homes were destroyed, and 1,831 more homes were damaged. Across the island, domestic flights, trains, and bus services were all suspended due to the storm; however, Taipei Songshan Airport remained open for international flights.

China

Due to the interaction with the mountains of Taiwan, Nina weakened to a tropical storm before making landfall in China. The storm crossed the coastline with winds of 110 km/h (70 mph); however, little damage resulted near where the system struck land. Further inland, the remnants of the storm produced widespread torrential rainfall, with more than  falling across an area of 19,410 km2 (7,500 mi2). The heaviest rainfall was recorded along the Banqiao Dam where  of rain fell,  of which fell in a six-hour span. These rains led to the collapse of the Banqiao Dam, which received 1-in-2000-year flood conditions. In all, 62 dams failed during the disaster, causing large temporary lakes and $1.2 billion (1975 USD, 6.06 billion USD in 2021) in damage. The floods killed 26,000 people, while another 100,000 people died from subsequent famine and disease. The overall death toll from the event was estimated as high as 230,000.

See also

 List of tropical cyclones
 Banqiao Dam
 Cyclone Nargis
 1970 Bhola cyclone – Deadliest tropical cyclone recorded worldwide

References

External links

 Nina 1975 best track data
 Joint Typhoon Warning Center
 FIFTH INTERNATIONAL WORKSHOP ON TROPICAL CYCLONES TOPIC 2.1 Observing and forecasting rainfall
 27th Conference on Hurricanes and Tropical Meteorology

1975 Pacific typhoon season
Typhoons in Taiwan
Typhoons in China
Typhoon Nina
Typhoons